Pédale douce (Soft Pedal) is a 1996 French comedy film directed by Gabriel Aghion. Fanny Ardant won the 1997 César Award for Best Actress for her performance as Eva.

Plot 
Adrien works in an advertising agency in the day and at night he becomes the queen of a gay bar, run by his best friend, the seductive Eva. When Alexandre Agut, a major client of Adrien, wants to get to know him, he asks Eva to pose as his wife. Everything gets carried away when Alexandre falls in love with her.

Cast
 Patrick Timsit - Adrien Aymar
 Fanny Ardant - Evelyne, called Eva
 Richard Berry - Alexandre Hagutte
 Michèle Laroque - Marie Hagutte
 Jacques Gamblin - André Lemoine
 Dominique Besnehard - Riki
  - Dr. Séverine
 Boris Terral - Cyril

Awards and nominations

Sequel 
A 2004's sequel Pédale dure (Pédale douce 3 : Elles sont tellement folles qu'elles ont oublié de faire le 2!) with Gérard Darmon, Michèle Laroque and Dany Boon but he has received generally very negative reviews.

References

External links 
 

1996 films
1990s French-language films
French LGBT-related films
Films directed by Gabriel Aghion
1996 LGBT-related films
LGBT-related comedy films
French comedy films
1996 comedy films
Films featuring a Best Actress César Award-winning performance
1990s French films